Tegin (also tigin, MC *dək-gɨn > Pinyin: Tèqín; , erroneously Tèlè ) is a Turkic title, commonly attachable to the names of the junior members of the Khagan's family. However, Ligeti cast doubts on the Turkic provenance by pointing to the non-Turkic plural form tegit

History
History records many people carrying the title Tegin. The best known is Kül Tigin (erroneously ), noted for the stele in his memory in the Orkhon inscriptions. Some Tegins founded and headed their own states. Alp-Tegin, founder of the Ghazni state, which grew into the Ghaznavid Empire; Arslan Tegin and Bughra Tegin, both instrumental in the creation of the Kara-Khanid Kaganate. The Chinese History of the Northern Dynasties states that the Hephthalite emperor of the Gandhara state was from a ruling clan of the neighboring Tegin state.  With time, the title tegin became a popular personal name, and now perseveres both as personal and family name, predominantly in the South Asia and Middle East areas. The Hungarian name Tétény, in old Hungarian Tühütüm likely descends from the title Tegin.

Notable Tigins
 Alp Tigin
 Anushtakin al-Dizbari
 Anushtegin Gharchai
 Kul Tigin
 Sabuktigin
 Böritigin
 Bilgetegin
 Gazi Gümüshtigin
 Al-Taj Gümüshtegin
 Tegin Shah
 Toghtekin
 Amin Khan Aitigin

References

History of the Turkic peoples
Turkic culture
Turkish words and phrases
Titles of the Göktürks